The .358 Norma Magnum is a rifle cartridge introduced in 1959 by Norma. The cartridge is closely related to the .308 Norma Magnum. Both calibers share the same dimensions of the case head as the .300 H&H Magnum, but have far less body taper, resulting in the same internal capacity in a shorter case. The cartridge case is the longest that will comfortably fit in a standard Mauser action, or any rifle action designed to chamber the .30-06. The .358 NM was the first .35 caliber cartridge commercially developed and sold to the American market since the decline of the .35 Newton in the late 1920s.

Uses
Though introduced by a Swedish company, the .358 Norma Magnum was designed for American hunters, due to Norma's chief designer Nils Kvale's close contacts with American colleagues. It is intended as a cartridge for the largest of North American game - elk, moose, brown bear, bighorn sheep, and bison, and shoots fast and flat enough to be useful to 400 to 500 yards on game the size of American elk (Wapiti). While it is needlessly powerful for deer-sized game, it can be used, at least with the heavier (and therefore slower) .358 bullets on such game without destroying too much meat. It would work well, with properly designed bullets, on most large African species.

Norma took a gamble, introducing the .358 only as new empty cases for handloaders, and chambering-reamer specifications for gunsmiths who made custom rifles—there were no factory rifles available, and it was several months before factory-loaded ammunition appeared. The cartridge proved immediately popular with hunters and custom gunsmiths, and within a year the Danish firm of Schultz & Larsen chambered its Model 65 for the round, and Husqvarna its Series 1600 and 1650 rifles.

The .358 Norma is what is known as a "short magnum," designed to work in long rifle actions; many .30-06 rifles such as the 1903 Springfield rifle have been rebarreled to the much-more powerful .358 Norma. Norma's factory ammunition for the .358 Norma drives a 250-grain bullet at 2880 fps and produces more than 4,600 ft-lbs (foot-pounds) of kinetic energy at the muzzle, while delivering a foot-ton of energy 500 yards downrange.

See also
 .338 Winchester Magnum
 .35 Whelen
 .350 Remington Magnum
 .358 Winchester
 .375 H&H Magnum
 9.3×62mm
 9.3×74mmR
 9.3×64mm Brenneke
 9 mm caliber
 List of rifle cartridges
 Table of handgun and rifle cartridges

References

Norma

Pistol and rifle cartridges
Magnum rifle cartridges